Glen Sennett Deweese (January 5, 1932 – September 27, 2001) was an American convenience store owner and Democratic politician. He was a member of the Mississippi State Senate from 1976 to 1992, and its president pro tempore from 1986 to 1992.

Biography 
Glen Sennett Deweese was born on January 5, 1932, in Philadelphia, Mississippi. He was first elected to the Mississippi State Senate in 1975 for the 1976-1980 term. In 1986, he became the President Pro Tempore of the Mississippi Senate, and served in the position from 1986 to 1992. His tenure in the Senate ended when he lost in the 1991 election. He died on September 27, 2001, in Meridian, Mississippi.

References 

1932 births
2001 deaths
Democratic Party Mississippi state senators
Presidents pro tempore of the Mississippi State Senate